Let There Be Music is the third album from the soft rock band Orleans, the first album on Asylum Records.  The album spawned two hit singles, including the title cut, which peaked at #55 on May 24–31, 1975, and "Dance With Me", which peaked at #6 on October 18, 1975, on the Billboard Singles Chart.

Cash Box said of the title track that "a great power chorded intro leads into a crisp rocking number which is reminiscent of the sound of the Doobie Brothers, The Who, and about a half dozen others" and that the "anthem-like qualities of this rocker and fine instrumental interplay add up to a hit." Record World said of the track that the "band comes up with the California brand of country rock boogie a la Eagles."

Track listing 
All songs written by John Hall and Johanna Hall except where noted.

 "Fresh Wind" - 3:21
 "Dance With Me" - 3:20 
 "Time Passes On" - 3:35
 "Your Life My Friend" - 3:14
 "Let There Be Music" (Larry Hoppen, Johanna Hall) - 4:04
 "Business As Usual" - 4:12
 "Cold Spell" - 4:18
 "Ending Of A Song" (Larry Hoppen, Marilyn Mason) - 3:19
 "Give One Heart" - 4:03
 "You've Given Me Something" - 3:48

Personnel 
 John Hall - guitars, lead and backing vocals, mandolin, percussion, electric piano (6)
 Larry Hoppen - guitars, lead and backing vocals, keyboards, synthesizers, melodica, trumpet, bass (2)
 Lance Hoppen - bass (all but 2), backing vocals
 Wells Kelly - drums, backing vocals, percussion

References

Orleans (band) albums
1975 albums
Albums produced by Chuck Plotkin
Asylum Records albums